The Ministry of Mining is the cabinet-level administrative office in charge of matters related to mining in Chile.

The mining sector contributed 16.4% of Chile's gross domestic product in 2009, 14,157 billion pesos, mostly from copper mining.

Since March 2022, the Minister of Mining is Marcela Hernando.

References

External links 
 Official site

Mining
Chile